Goat milk is the milk of domestic goats. Goats produce about 2% of the world's total annual milk supply. Some goats are bred specifically for milk. Goat milk naturally has small, well-emulsified fat globules, which means the cream will stay in suspension for a longer period of time than cow's milk; therefore, it does not need to be homogenized. Eventually, the cream will rise to the top over a period of a few days. If the milk is to be used to make cheese, homogenization is not recommended, as this changes the structure of the milk, affecting the culture's ability to coagulate the milk and the final quality and yield of cheese.

Dairy goats in their prime (generally around the third or fourth lactation cycle) average——of milk production daily—roughly —during a ten-month lactation, producing more just after freshening and gradually dropping in production toward the end of their lactation.  The milk generally averages 3.5% butterfat.

Сheese

Goat milk is commonly processed into cheese, butter, ice cream, yogurt, cajeta and other products.

Goat cheese is known as fromage de chèvre ("goat cheese") in France. Some varieties include Rocamadour and Montrachet.  Goat butter is white because goats produce milk with the yellow beta-carotene converted to a colorless form of vitamin A. Goat milk has less cholesterol.

Nutrition
Breast milk is the best nutrition for infants. If this is not an option, infant formula is the alternative. EFSA (European Food Safety Association) concluded in 2012 that goat milk protein is suitable as a protein source in infant and follow-on formulas. Ever since goat milk based infant formulas have rapidly gained popularity around the world, including the UK, Australia, Germany, Netherlands, China, Korea, Australia and New Zealand. These formulas are not produced by the infant formula multinationals but by companies that focus on specialties infant formulas. In the U.S. goat milk infant formula is not yet available.

The American Academy of Pediatrics (AAP) recognizes that goat infant formula has been thoroughly reviewed and supports normal growth and development in infants.

Like unmodified cow's milk, the American Academy of Pediatrics (AAP) discourages feeding infants unmodified goat's milk. An April 2010 case report describes an infant fed raw goat milk and summarizes AAP's recommendation and presents "a comprehensive review of the consequences associated with this dangerous practice", also stating, "Many infants are exclusively fed unmodified goat's milk as a result of cultural beliefs as well as exposure to false online information. Anecdotal reports have described a host of morbidities associated with that practice, including severe electrolyte abnormalities, metabolic acidosis, megaloblastic anemia, allergic reactions including life-threatening anaphylactic shock, hemolytic uremic syndrome, and infections." Untreated caprine brucellosis results in a 2% case fatality rate. According to the USDA, doe milk is not recommended for human infants because it contains "inadequate quantities of iron, folate, vitamins C and D, thiamine, niacin, vitamin B6, and pantothenic acid to meet an infant’s nutritional needs" and may cause harm to an infant's kidneys and could cause metabolic damage.

According to the Canadian federal health department Health Canada, most of the dangers of, and counter-indications for, feeding unmodified goat's milk to infants parallel those associated with unmodified cow's milk — especially insofar as allergic reactions go.

A 1970 book on animal breeding claimed that does' milk differs from cows' or humans' milk by having higher digestibility, distinct alkalinity, higher buffering capacity, and certain therapeutic values in human medicine and nutrition.  George Mateljan suggested doe milk can replace ewe milk or cow milk in diets of those who are allergic to certain mammals' milk. However, like cow milk, doe milk has lactose (sugar), and may cause gastrointestinal problems for individuals with lactose intolerance.  In fact, the level of lactose is similar to that of cow milk.

Some researchers and companies producing goat's milk products have made claims that goat's milk is better for human health than most Western cow's milk due to it mostly lacking a form of β-casein proteins called A1, and instead mostly containing the A2 form, which does not metabolize to β-casomorphin 7 in the body.

Like whole cow's milk, whole goat's milk is not recommended for use by infants due to the discrepancy between the composition of whole milk and breastmilk and the imperfection of the child's digestive organs for digesting evolutionarily unsuitable food. Lack of folic acid when using whole milk instead of breastfeeding in children leads to the development of B12 folate deficiency anemia. In the event of an allergic reaction in children to cow's milk, contrary to popular belief, the likelihood of developing it to goat's milk is equally high.

These compositions vary by breed (especially in the Nigerian Dwarf breed), animal, and point in the lactation period.

References 

Milk by animal
Goats